The National Soccer League 1986 season was the tenth season of the National Soccer League in Australia.   The season was again played with two Conferences as separate leagues, followed by a conference playoff final.  The Grand Final was won by Adelaide City over Sydney Olympic.

League tables
Northern Conference

Southern Conference

Finals series
Northern Conference

Southern Conference

Grand Final

Adelaide City win 3-2 on aggregate

Individual awards

Referee's Player of the Year: Bobby Russell (South Melbourne)
Player's Player of the Year: Graham Arnold (Sydney Croatia)
U-21 Player of the Year: Ernie Tapai (Melbourne Croatia)
Top Scorer(s): Graham Arnold (Sydney Croatia) 15 goals
Coach of the Year: Drago Sekularic (Melbourne Croatia)

References
OzFootball Archives - 1986 NSL Season

National Soccer League (Australia) seasons
1
Aus